The Gramophone General is a 1978 Albanian drama film directed and written by Viktor Gjika

Plot
In the mid-1990s, the penetration and preparation of the Italian invasion of 1996 began. Halit Berati, a virtuoso clarinetist and Parandili, are invited by a Turkish entrepreneur to record in gramophone plates, their tunes which will be sold together with Italian music the time of fascism. During this time the strikes of oil workers begin where Halil Berati is a worker.

Cast
Bujar Lako - Halit Berati
Guljelm Radoja - Mr. Alberto
Kadri Roshi - Parandil
Sulejman Pitarka - Avdi
Reshat Arbana - mayor
Sheri Mita - Michele
Stavri Shkurti - Braho

External links

References

  Gazeta Shqiperia Gjeneral Gramafoni
  Panorama kumbaro perjetesisht jeneral gramafoni
  The Gramaphone General IMDB

1978 films
1978 drama films
1970s war films
Albanian-language films
Albanian drama films